John Oliver Ernst (December 4, 1899 – March 9, 1968) was an American football running back. He played six seasons for the Pottsville Maroons, New York Yankees, Boston Bulldogs, and Frankford Yellow Jackets. In 1925 Jack helped the Maroons win the NFL Championship, before it was stripped from the team due to a disputed rules violation.

References
Jack Ernst's profile at NFL.com

1899 births
1968 deaths
American football running backs
Players of American football from Pennsylvania
Boston Bulldogs (NFL) players
Lafayette Leopards football players
Pottsville Maroons players
New York Yankees (NFL) players
Frankford Yellow Jackets players